Black Lake is a lake in the northern part of New York in the United States and is the largest lake in Saint Lawrence County.  The lake is south of the Saint Lawrence River and parallels the river for many miles.

Black Lake is of glacial origin, having been formed by the melting of continental glaciation in the state around 12,000 years ago.

Water flows into the lake from several sources, the largest being the Indian River.  The lake drains into the Oswegatchie River and then into the Saint Lawrence River. The northeast end of the lake is south of Ogdensburg, New York.

The Mohawk people referred to the lake as Kanientàrhón:tsi, which translates to "lake is black".

Description
There are at least 25 named islands in the lake.

Fishing 

The water is brown stained and at times visibility gets down to under 2 feet. There are many species of fish present in the lake such as largemouth bass, smallmouth bass, walleye, northern pike, black crappie, bluegill, yellow perch, brown bullhead, muskellunge. Some have come across sturgeons.  Historically, longnose gar, Lepisosteus osseus, had a naturally reproducing population in the lake.

Notable people from the area 
George A. Mitchell, founder of Cadillac, Michigan

References

External links 
  Official Black Lake Web Site
 St. Lawrence County Chamber of Commerce fishing information

Lakes of New York (state)
Lakes of St. Lawrence County, New York